James Myers may refer to:
 
 James E. Myers (1919–2001), American songwriter, co-credited writer (as Jimmy DeKnight) of "Rock Around the Clock"
 James Myers (politician) (1795–1864), American politician, Lieutenant Governor of Ohio, 1854–1856
 Jim Myers (1921–2014), American football coach
 Jimmy Myers (baseball) (born 1969), former Major League Baseball pitcher
 James J. Myers (1842–1915), politician in Massachusetts

See also
 James Myer (born 1951), American documentary and educational filmmaker